The Brazilian Red Cross was founded in 1908. It has its headquarters in Brasília.

History
In 1907, physician Joaquim de Oliveira Botelho proposed organizing the Brazilian Red Cross in Rio de Janeiro and gained support from members of the Brazilian Historic and Geographic Institute. Articles of Association were drafted and approved on 5 December 1908, and the organization gained recognition as a national branch of the International Committee of the Red Cross in the period from 1910 to 1912. In 1912, the physician Marie Rennotte founded the branch for the state of São Paulo. By 1919, the organization had joined the International Federation of Red Cross and Red Crescent Societies.

See also
 International Red Cross and Red Crescent Movement

References

https://cvb.rc-app.com

External links
 Brazilian Red Cross Profile
 Official Red Cross Web Site 

Red Cross and Red Crescent national societies
1978 establishments in Brazil
Organizations established in 1978
Medical and health organisations based in Brazil